Hamlin Peak is a  mountain located in Baxter State Park in Piscataquis County, Maine. Hamlin Peak is a northern spur of the greater Mount Katahdin massif and is flanked to the south by Baxter Peak, and to the north by the Howe Peaks.

The southeast face of Hamlin Peak drains into the Great Basin, where water ultimately flows into the Penobscot River and eventually empties into the Atlantic Ocean at Penobscot Bay.

There are several trails that lead to or near the summit of Hamlin Peak.

Gallery

See also 
 List of mountains in Maine

References

Mountains of Piscataquis County, Maine
North Maine Woods
Mountains of Maine